K257 or K-257 may refer to:

K-257 (Kansas highway), a former state highway in Kansas
Mass in C major, K. 257 "Credo" by Mozart (1776)